Lipiany  is a town in the West Pomeranian Voivodeship of Poland, with 4,156 inhabitants (2004).

International relations

Twin towns — Sister cities
Lipiany is twinned with:
 Saint-Genest-d'Ambière, France
 Wietzendorf, Germany

Cities and towns in West Pomeranian Voivodeship
Pyrzyce County